An election to Letterkenny Town Council took place on 5 June 2009 as part of that year's Irish local elections. 9 councillors were elected by PR-STV voting for a five-year term of office. LTC was abolished in 2014.

Results by party

References

External links
 2009 Letterkenny Town Council election at electionsireland.org

2009 Irish local elections
Politics of Letterkenny